Tracey Hoyt (born January 14, 1964 in Chatham-Kent, Ontario, Canada) is a Canadian voice actress and alumna of York University and the Second City National Touring Company (Toronto), possessing a Bachelor of Fine Arts in Theatre Performance. She played the first North American voice of Rini in the Sailor Moon R series and the three Sailor Moon movies. Hoyt played the voice of Me Bear in 2005's The Care Bears' Big Wish Movie. Currently, she appears as Ms. Deeds in Delilah & Julius (Family Channel Canada) and as Guinivere in Bob and Margaret. (YTV Canada). Tracey is a double Gemini nominee for her work on CBC TV's comedy series The Tournament. She has voiced hundreds of radio and TV commercials.

Filmography
Bob and Margaret – Guinivere
Outcast – Lisa
Street Legal – Immigration Officer #2
Keroppi – Keroleen, Meroleen ("The Frog's Secret House") (English dub) 
Super Jem Duo – Jem 
Flash Gordon – Princess Aura
Gotti – Woman On Camera 5
Time to Say Goodbye? – Mary
Supertown Challenge – Sue Vanditelli
Sailor Moon – Rini (Season 2)
Sailor Moon R the Movie: Promise of the Rose – Rini
Sailor Moon S the Movie: Hearts in Ice – Rini/Sailor Mini Moon
Sailor Moon SuperS the Movie: Black Dream Hole – Rini/Super Sailor Mini Moon
Scandalous Me: The Jacqueline Susann Story – Harper Lee
The Koala Brothers – Ned (voice only; all episodes)
Pecola
Straight in the Face – Marilyn
The World of Piwi — Lillie (1st voice), Emily (1st voice)
Sue Thomas: F.B.Eye – Mrs. Whitcombe
Godsend – Delivery Nurse
Radio Free Roscoe – Miss Emily Mitchell
Doc – Kathleen
The Tournament – Aurora Farqueson
Kevin Hill – Gwen Claypool
This Is Wonderland – Business Woman
The Prize Winner of Defiance, Ohio – Betty White
Care Bears: Big Wish Movie – Me Bear
M.V.P. – Charge Nurse
The Cat in the Hat Knows a Lot About That! - Nick's Mom/Sally's Mom
Decoys

References

External links

1950 births
Canadian film actresses
Canadian television actresses
Canadian voice actresses
People from Chatham-Kent
Living people
20th-century Canadian actresses
21st-century Canadian actresses